Hudson Oaks is a city in Parker County, Texas, United States located in the Dallas-Fort Worth Metroplex.

History

Geography

Hudson Oaks is located at  (32.750427, –97.696978).

The city is located in between Weatherford and Willow Park. IH-20 splits the city into two sections, north and south. These sections include many residential neighborhoods and a robust selection of businesses. Hudson Oaks is roughly 20 miles west of Fort Worth and 40 miles west of Dallas. 

Hudson Oaks has three highways that intersect in the city, IH-20, Bankhead Highway and US 180.

History

Hudson Oaks was founded in 1978. The city currently has a 15 man Police Department and contracts with Weatherford Fire Department. The city is made up of several affluent sub-divisions to include, Red Eagle, Diamond Oaks, Parker Oaks, Enchanted Oaks and Red Oak Hills. 

In 1969, shortly before the city was incorporated Highway Patrolman Douglas Thompson was struck and killed by a hit-and-run driver. A memorial for Patrolman Thompson is held annually. 

Hudson Oaks has been the site of two differing family murder-suicides. One occurring in Hudson Oaks and the other just outside of the city limits. Both occurring in the 2000's. On July 16, 2002, Dee Etta Perez shot and killed her three children shortly before shooting herself. The second family murder-suicide occurred on May 29, 2007, where Gilberta Estrada and her four children were found dead in their mobile home in an apparent family murder-suicide. 

In 2019 the successful HEB grocery chain opened up their 8th North Texas location in Hudson Oaks. The city has boasted a number of new businesses which have coined them the nickname, The Entertainment Capital of Parker County. The city also has an annual fireworks show termed Boomin' Fourth and a Christmas festival named COHOHO.  

History was made in 2022 when Hudson Oaks connected to the City of Fort Worth's 36 inch main water line which now provides water to the city. Prior to this change, Hudson Oaks and nearby Willow Park had been using Lake Weatherford for water supplies.

Demographics

As of the 2020 United States census, there were 2,174 people, 845 households, and 686 families residing in the city.

Education

Hudson Oaks is served by the Weatherford and Aledo Independent School Districts.

References

External links
 https://newsroom.heb.com/h-e-b-opens-hudson-oaks-strore-expanding-commitment-to-north-texas/
 https://www.dps.texas.gov/memorial/highway-patrolman-douglas-houston-thompson

External links
 

Dallas–Fort Worth metroplex
Cities in Texas
Cities in Parker County, Texas